Rachel Cox may refer to:

 Rachel Cox (actress), British actress
 Rachel S. Cox, journalist and author
 Rachel Cox, politician, author and nonprofit leader 
 Rachel Cox (photographer), American photographer